Shushnur (Şuşnur) is a rural locality (a selo) and the administrative centre of Shushnursky Selsoviet, Krasnokamsky District, Bashkortostan, Russia. The population was 471 as of 2010. There are 5 streets.

Geography 
Shushnur is located 36 km southeast of Nikolo-Beryozovka (the district's administrative centre) by road. Novaya Mushta is the nearest rural locality.

References 

Rural localities in Krasnokamsky District